Paul Vincent Petrino (born May 25, 1967) is an American football coach, currently the offensive coordinator at Central Michigan University. He was previously the head football coach for nine seasons at the University of Idaho in Moscow, Idaho.

Early life
Born in Butte, Montana, Petrino grew up in Helena and graduated from its Capital High School. Recruited by the University of Montana in Missoula, Petrino stayed in Helena and attended Carroll College. He played quarterback for the Fighting Saints, where his father, Bob Petrino Sr., was the head coach from 1971 to 1998. Both are members of Carroll's athletic hall of fame.

Coaching career
Petrino began his coaching career as an assistant coach at Carroll shortly after graduation. He worked as an assistant coach, wide receiver coach, and offensive coordinator at several other schools in the next 20 years, including a short stint with the Atlanta Falcons of the National Football League (NFL) in 2007. In 2006, while serving as offensive coordinator and wide receivers coach at Louisville, Petrino was a finalist for the Broyles Award, given annually to the nation's top college football assistant coach.

Idaho
In December 2012, Petrino became the head coach at Idaho, where he had worked in the early 1990s under  After the announcement, Arkansas athletic director Jeff Long praised Petrino, saying he would have named Petrino the interim Arkansas head coach if not for his brother Bobby's resignation after a scandal. Following the 2016 season, Petrino was named the Sun Belt Coach of the Year after improving the Vandals from 4–8 the previous season to 8–4. The season was capped with a ninth win, in the Famous Idaho Potato Bowl in Boise. After more than two decades back in the Football Bowl Subdivision (FBS), Idaho returned to the Big Sky Conference in FCS in 2018.

In 2019, he passed Skip Stahley,  in eight seasons (1954–61). Third on that list is Robb Akey,  in six seasons (2007–12), and did not coach the final four games of 2012, all losses; fourth is Tom Cable,  in four seasons (2000–03).

Following his firing in Idaho, Petrino briefly joined the staff at South Alabama as an offensive analyst, before joining Jim McElwain's staff at Central Michigan as the offensive coordinator.

Personal life
Petrino is the younger brother, by six years, of former Louisville head coach Bobby Petrino; both were quarterbacks at Carroll. When Paul was a player, Bobby was the offensive coordinator. The brothers have worked together on coaching teams such as Louisville, the Atlanta Falcons, and Arkansas. His son, Mason Petrino, played quarterback for him at Idaho, and started in games from 2017 to 2019.

Head coaching record

References

External links
 Central Michigan profile
 Idaho profile

1967 births
Living people
American football quarterbacks
Arkansas Razorbacks football coaches
Atlanta Falcons coaches
Carroll Fighting Saints football coaches
Carroll Fighting Saints football players
Central Michigan Chippewas football coaches
Idaho Vandals football coaches
Illinois Fighting Illini football coaches
Louisville Cardinals football coaches
Southern Miss Golden Eagles football coaches
Utah State Aggies football coaches
Sportspeople from Butte, Montana
Coaches of American football from Montana
Players of American football from Montana